The 2022 Hawaii Senate elections was held on November 8, 2022, to elect senators in all 25 districts of the Hawaii Senate. Due to the chamber's use of the 2-4-4 term system, members were elected in single-member constituencies, with half of them serving two-year terms and the other half serving four-year terms. These elections were held concurrently with various federal and state elections, including for Governor of Hawaii. Partisan primaries were held on August 13.

The Democratic Party maintained supermajority control of the chamber, although Republicans were able to win two seats, a first for the party since the 2008 election.

Predictions

Overview

Summary by district

Closest races 
Districts where the margin of victory was under 10%:

Retiring incumbents

Democrats 
 District 6: Rosalyn Baker is retiring.
 District 11: Brian Taniguchi is retiring.
 District 19: Clarence Nishihara is retiring.

Incumbents defeated

In primary elections

Democrats 
 District 1: Laura Acasio lost a redistricting race to fellow incumbent Lorraine Inouye.
 District 16: Bennette Misalucha lost renomination to Brandon Elefante.

In general elections

Democrats 
 District 23: Gil Riviere lost re-election to Brenton Awa.

Detailed results

District 1

Democratic primary

General election

District 2

Republican primary

General election

District 3

District 4

District 5

District 6

Democratic primary

Republican primary

General election

District 7

Democratic primary

General election

District 8

District 9

District 10

Republican primary

General election

District 11

Democratic primary

General election

District 12

District 13

District 14

District 15

District 16

Democratic primary

General election

District 17

Republican primary

General election

District 18

Republican primary

General election

District 19

Democratic primary

General election

District 20

District 21

District 22

District 23

Republican primary

General election

District 24

Republican primary

General election

District 25

See also 
 2022 Hawaii gubernatorial election
 2022 Hawaii House of Representatives election

Notes

References 

Senate
Hawaii Senate elections
Hawaii Senate